Paul Rummo (14 July 1909 Kalbu, Kehtna Parish, Harju County – 28 March 1981) was an Estonian poet, playwright and literary critic.

1948–1949, he was the chief editor for the publishing house Ilukirjandus ja Kunst ('Fiction and Art'). Before 1958, he had several posts: including the head of Estonia Theatre.

His son is writer Paul-Eerik Rummo.

Works
 poetry collection "Võitlev kodumaa" ('The Fighting Homeland'; 1946) 
 poetry collection "Rahva võim" (1950)
 poetry collection "Katkukülvajad" (1952)
 poetry collection "Veerev kivi" ('Rolling Stone'; 1955)
 poetry collection "Proloog ja poeemid" (1961)
 poetry collection "Katkenud lõng" (with selected poems; 1969)
 poetry collection "Matkalaul" (1979)

In 1967, he finished the anthology "Eesti luule" ('Estonian Poetry')

References

1909 births
1981 deaths
Estonian male poets
20th-century Estonian poets
People from Kehtna Parish